Emma Thompson Kelly (December 17, 1918 – January 17, 2001) was an American musician. Known as the "Lady of 6,000 Songs", she appeared in both John Berendt's 1994 book Midnight in the Garden of Good and Evil and its 1997 movie adaptation.

Her nickname was given to her by Johnny Mercer, who — after challenging her to play numerous songs he named — estimated she knew 6,000 songs from memory.

Personal life
Kelly was married to George Kelly for 47 years — from 1936 until his death from a heart attack in 1983 at the age of 70. Together they had ten children.

Death
Kelly died on January 17, 2001, from a liver ailment. She was 82.

Accolades
Kelly was inducted into the Georgia Music Hall of Fame in 1998. She performed at the event.

References

External links

Emma Thompson Kelly at FindAGrave.com
Emma Kelly - Statesboro - YouTube, May 7, 2010

1918 births
2001 deaths
People from Statesboro, Georgia
20th-century American women pianists
20th-century American pianists
21st-century American women pianists
21st-century American pianists